Cochisea is a genus of moths in the family Geometridae erected by William Barnes and James Halliday McDunnough in 1916.

Species
 Cochisea barnesi Cassino & Swett, 1922
 Cochisea curva Rindge, 1975
 Cochisea paula Rindge, 1975
 Cochisea recisa Rindge, 1975
 Cochisea rigidaria Barnes & McDunnough, 1916
 Cochisea sinuaria Barnes & McDunnough, 1916
 Cochisea sonomensis McDunnough, 1941
 Cochisea undulata Rindge, 1975
 Cochisea unicoloris Rindge, 1975

References

Bistonini
Taxa named by William Barnes (entomologist)
Taxa named by James Halliday McDunnough